Eric Mansfield may refer to:
Eric Harold Mansfield (1923–2016), aeronautical engineer
Eric L. Mansfield, North Carolina state senator